A. metallica may refer to:
 Aplonis metallica, the metallic starling or shining starling, a bird species native of New Guinea and nearby Australasian islands
 Autographa metallica, the shanded gold spot, a moth species found in North-Western America
 Avicularia metallica, the metallic pinktoe, a tarantula species found in the tropical forests of Colombia

See also
 Metallica (disambiguation)